Anahat Singh (born 13 March 2008) is an Indian squash player. At the age of 14, she was the youngest athlete to represent India at the 2022 Commonwealth Games. , she is the top ranked player in Asia in the Girls U15 category.

Early life 
Initially, Singh had started playing badminton when she was six years old. She used to accompany her sister Amira, who played squash. Singh played in some squash tournaments where she performed well. Subsequently, she grew fond of the game and switched to squash at the age of eight.

Career 
Singh rose to prominence after winning the Girls U11 title at the British Junior Open Squash in January 2019, followed by the Girls U13 title at the Dutch Junior Open Squash in July the same year. She was also a part of the 2021–22 PSA World Tour, by virtue of reaching quarterfinals of the   Indian Tour – Noida held during 4-7 September 2021. In June 2022, she won the Girls U15 title of the Asian Junior Squash Individual Championships.

At the 2023 edition of the British Junior Open Squash, Anahat became the champion in Girls U15 category after beating Egypt's Sohaila Hazem in the final.

References 

2008 births
Living people
Sportswomen from Delhi
Racket sportspeople from Delhi
Indian female squash players
21st-century Indian women
Commonwealth Games competitors for India
Squash players at the 2022 Commonwealth Games